Christopher Charles Lovell (born 1 June 1967) is a former English cricketer.  Lovell was a right-handed batsman who bowled right-arm medium-fast.  He was born at St Austell, Cornwall.

Lovell made his Minor Counties Championship debut for Cornwall in 1986 against Buckinghamshire.  From 1986 to 1996, he represented the county in 55 Minor Counties Championship matches, the last of which came against Devon.  Lovell also represented Cornwall in the MCCA Knockout Trophy.  His debut in that competition came against Wiltshire in 1988.  From 1988 to 1995, he represented the county in 10 Trophy matches, the last of which came against Dorset.

Lovell also represented Cornwall in 3 List A matches.  These came against Derbyshire in the 1986 NatWest Trophy, Middlesex in the 1995 NatWest Trophy and Warwickshire in the 1996 NatWest Trophy.  In his 3 List A matches, he scored 8 runs at a batting average of 2.66, with a high score of 7.  In the field he took a single catch.  With the ball he took 4 wickets at a bowling average of 66.00, with best figures of 2/107.

References

External links
Christopher Lovell at Cricinfo
Christopher Lovell at CricketArchive

1967 births
Living people
People from St Austell
English cricketers
Cornwall cricketers